Sooner or Sooners may refer to:

 Sooners, early Oklahoma, US settlers
 Oklahoma Sooners, University of Oklahoma varsity sports teams named after the early settlers
 Ottawa Sooners, Canadian football team in Ontario
 18876 Sooner, asteroid
 A Girl Named Sooner, a 1975 TV movie
Sooner, a movie streaming service available in Germany and all Benelux countries

See also
 
 
 Sooner or Later (disambiguation)
 The Sooner It Comes, album by Aloud
 Schooner (disambiguation)